AeroTech is a  tabletop wargame published by FASA and set in the BattleTech universe. It simulates combat between aerospace fighters, troop-carrying DropShips, and interstellar JumpShips and WarShips. The name "AeroTech" defines space/air elements of BattleTech universe. There have been five revisions of these rules.

AeroTech
The first rule set was simply known as AeroTech and later referred to as AeroTech 1 or AT1. The AT1 release was a large introduction box set that could be played as a complete independent game that co-exists in the BattleTech universe, compatible with the regular ground game. The rule set introduced aerospace fighters (space/air-capable fighter craft), dropships, and jumpships.

Some individual information for dropships, aircraft, and aerospace fighters was listed in out-of-print books — Technical Readout: 2750, Technical Readout: 3025, Technical Readout: 3026, and Dropships and Jumpships (BattleTech) by Clare Hess (Paperback – April 1988). Expanded AT1 rules were also included in the first edition of Roleplaying Guidebook MechWarrior.

Due to balance problems, AT1 was replaced by an edition known as BattleSpace.

BattleSpace
BattleSpace is the second edition to BattleTech'''s air and space rules. This rule set introduced principal rules for warships to the game. It came in a large introduction box like AeroTech, and included an extensive history of the universe up to 3057. Due rule changes, some aircraft/aerospace craft abilities were altered to the point of being rendered useless for gameplay.

A supplement information book was printed for individual vehicles used in the game. Now out of print Technical Readout: 3057.

AeroTech2
The third edition of the Aerospace rules was based on BattleSpace rules. There were fewer rules to slow down gameplay. Additional new units were introduced to the games including new warships, aerospace fighters, and dropships.  These new units were listed in Technical Readout: 3067 and Technical Readout: 3026 Revised.AeroTech2 (or AT2) was one of the last rules sets FASA Corporation published before closing in 2001.

AeroTech2 Revised
The fourth edition of the Aerospace rules cleared up problems encountered in the original AeroTech2 rulebook. Additionally, the book expanded to include new art, mini technical readouts for various aerospace fighters, and the color schemes of factions' navies who have warships. These full-color pictures were of metal warship miniatures.AeroTech2 Revised, also known as AT2R, was launched to a large worldwide event in 2003. The Leviathen II Heavy Battleship (Warship) was introduced as part of re-launched of the rules being published by new license owners FanPro. This was an exclusive prize for the winner of an AT2R launch event. AT2R introduced fighter squadron rules to allow small fighters to be able take on more powerful units in the game.

The supplement book listing individual ships of the game was revised and additional "lost" warships were introduced to the game. The book was renamed Technical Readout: 3057 Revised.

Further versions
The fourth edition of the rules, AeroTech 2R (Revised)" was re-organized when BattleTech relaunched itself in 2006.

The fifth version of the play introduces new construction rules for Aerospace units of BattleTech in the new rule set series named Total Warfare. The playing/construction rules are now being broken up into two sets of rules: tournament and non-tournament. Tournament play rules cover from small craft, fighters, and dropships are placed in the tournament rules sets for play: Total Warfare and construction in TechManual.

Non-tournament rules cover larger units or formations: fighter squadrons, jumpships, warships, and space stations. These rules are found in Strategic Operations (SO) and integrate with BattleForce rules set to be able to operate large formation(s) of aerospace units including larger units with the ground assets. In addition, numerous optional advanced rules have been included in SO for aerospace play and construction of advanced aerospace units.

In addition, SO also provides for clear rules for interaction with ground units, and abstract gameplay for the large and small aerospace units would before more a campaign setting requiring more details for casual gameplay.Tactical Operations, another Total Warfare series advance rules book, includes new Advanced Aerospace type equipment which is considered non-tournament.

New units and historical units were added and reprinted in 2008's Technical Readout: 3075.

Previous publications are compatible or converted for use in the Total Warfare series of rules books.

Reception
Scott Tanner reviewed AeroTech in Space Gamer/Fantasy Gamer No. 78. Tanner commented that "All in all, AeroTech is a nice game, but is certainly not necessary for the system as a whole."

ReviewsAdventurer (Issue 7 - Feb 1987)White Wolf'' #7 (1987)

References

External links
 

BattleTech games
Science fiction board wargames
Wargames introduced in the 1980s